Clare Bowditch (born 1975) is an Australian musician, actress, radio presenter and business entrepreneur.

At the ARIA Music Awards of 2006, Bowditch won the ARIA Award for Best Female Artist and was nominated for a Logie Award for her work on the TV series Offspring in 2012. She has toured with Gotye and Leonard Cohen, written for Harpers Bazaar, Rolling Stone and Drum. She currently hosts an Australian music program on a Qantas airlines in-flight audio channel.

Bowditch is currently an ambassador for the Australasian Performing Right Association (APRA), Pirate Party of Canada (PPCA) and Smiling Mind. She is also a member of the Victorian state government's Live Music Round Table Panel. She was the secretary of the Music Victoria board until 2012.

Life and career

1975-1997: Early life
Bowditch was born in Melbourne and raised in the suburb of Sandringham.

She graduated from the University of Melbourne's School of Creative Arts with a Bachelor of Creative Arts (BCA), a now-defunct degree.

1998-2002: Red Raku
Bowditch began writing songs at the age of three and continued writing them in private until 1998 when she met John Hedigan and, on the same night, formed a band called themselves Red Raku. Red Raku self-released two albums, Sweetly Sedated (1998) and Roda Leisis May (2002). Producer and drummer Marty Brown collaborated with the band and in 2002 Bowditch and Brown had a daughter, Asha.

2003-2008: The Feeding Set
In 2003, Libby Chow and Warren Bloomer joined and the band changed their name to Clare Bowditch & The Feeding Set. The band released Autumn Bone. Later in 2003, they signed with Capitol Records which rereleased the album.

In 2005, Bowditch was invited by Deborah Conway to take part in the Broad Festival project with three other Australian female artists at which they performed their own and each other's songs. With Bowditch and Conway were Sara Storer, Katie Noonan and Ruby Hunter.

In October 2005, Bowditch and The Feeding Set released their second album, What Was Left, on EMI. The album peaked at number 35 on the ARIA Chart. At the ARIA Music Awards of 2006, Bowditch won the ARIA Award for Best Female Artist.

In October 2007, Melbourne guitarist Tim Harvey (Jade Imagine)joined the band and Bowditch and the Feeding Set released their third album, The Moon Looked On. The album peaked at number 29 on the ARIA Chart. At the ARIA Music Awards of 2008, the album was nominated for two awards.

In late 2008, Bowditch completed a twenty-five date sold out date solo tour through major and regional venues in Australia, during which time she was supported by Australian band Hot Little Hands.

2009-2010: The New Slang
In 2009, Bowditch and her family temporarily relocated to Berlin, Germany, where she wrote the album Modern Day Addiction. The album was partly recorded with producer Mocky (who has also worked with Feist, Gonzales, Jamie Lidell and Peaches) at the Hansa studios in Berlin and completed in Australia with her newly expanded eight-piece band the New Slang. The album marked a change in direction for Bowditch, having been written on a Casio keyboard and piano.

In October 2009, she released her first single, "The Start of War". The song also features Bowditch's partner, Marty Brown, and Mick Harvey, formerly of Nick Cave and the Bad Seeds. The album became both 3RRR's and ABC Radio National's Album of the Week. The album peaked at number 10 on the ARIA Charts. At the ARIA Music Awards of 2010, the album was nominated for three awards.

Bowditch supported Leonard Cohen on his 2010 Australian tour after being handpicked by the Canadian singer-songwriter. Bowditch was joined by fellow Australian musician Deborah Conway, who was the support act for the second show of the Melbourne stop of the tour. Bowditch revealed in a 2012 interview that she received a marriage proposal from Cohen during the tour, which also involved a shared journey in Cohen's private tour jet—Bowditch turned down the proposal and explained, "I got to spend all that time with him. Most of the time I just sat there watching and smiling and being amazed at the theatre of it all. He was absolutely charming."

2011-present: solo work
In 2011, Bowditch co-wrote and performed a successful musical stage show based on the life and music of Eva Cassidy. The show, entitled Tales from the Life of Eva Cassidy, featured Bowditch singing Cassidy's songs in the style of Cassidy, in addition to telling stories behind the songs and life of the late singer. The sold-out show was performed consecutively over two weeks at the Atheneum Theatre in Melbourne.

In July 2011, Bowditch released the EP Are You Ready Yet?, which featured the single "Now That You're Here" (with Lanie Lane).

In May 2012, Bowditch released the single, "You Make Me Happy", which was featured in the TV series Offspring. Bowditch plays Rosanna Harding in the series; a musician who does some work with Billie's husband Mick, played by Eddie Perfect.

Bowditch's fifth studio album, The Winter I Chose Happiness, was released on 14 September 2012. The album peaked at number 11 on the ARIA Charts. At the ARIA Music Awards of 2013, the album was nominated for an award.

In 2013, Bowditch founded the creative social enterprise, Big Hearted Business (BHB). It exists to teach creative people about business, and business people about creativity, in ways that make sense.

The inaugural Big Hearted Business conference was held on 23 and 24 March 2013 at the Abbotsford Convent in Melbourne, Australia. The speakers list of the event included comedian Catherine Deveny, writer Rachel Power and designer Lucy Feagins.

In October 2019, Bowditch released her first book, Your Own Kind of Girl, a partial memoir from her early life, published in Australian and New Zealand by Allen & Unwin, who acquired the rights after a highly competitive auction between eight publishers.

In 2020, Bowditch released the Audible Original podcast series 'Tame Your Inner Critic'.

Personal life
Bowditch and husband Marty Brown were introduced to each other via their bandmate John Hedigan in 1997. They are now parents to three children - a daughter, Asha, in 2002 and identical twin boys in 2007.

Bowditch has been approached to take on several roles as a "social commentator": she wrote an article for ABC's The Drum, entitled "Mr Jones and Me", and also made her debut on the ABC's Q&A program (she was the first panelist to also perform a song — "Bigger Than the Money").

In December 2015, it was announced that Bowditch would be undertaking the role of program host for the afternoon radio program of ABC Radio Melbourne, starting on 25 January 2016. She presented her last programme on 29 November 2017, leaving to pursue other activities.

Discography

Albums

Extended plays

Singles

Other appearances

Awards and nominations

APRA Awards
The APRA Awards are presented annually from 1982 by the Australasian Performing Right Association (APRA), "honouring composers and songwriters". They commenced in 1982.

! 
|-
| 2013 
| "You Make Me Happy" (Clare Bowditch and Eddie Perfect)
| Song of the Year
| 
| 
|-

ARIA Music Awards
The ARIA Music Awards is an annual awards ceremony that recognises excellence, innovation, and achievement across all genres of Australian music. Clare Bowditch has won one award from eight nominations.

|-
| 2006
| What Was Left
| Best Female Artist
| 
|-
| rowspan="2"|2008
| rowspan="2"| The Moon Looked On
| Best Female Artist
| 
|-
| Best Adult Contemporary Album
| 
|-
| rowspan="3"|2010
| rowspan="2"| Modern Day Addiction
| Best Female Artist
| 
|-
| Best Adult Alternative Album
| 
|-
| Victor Van Vugt for Clare Bowditch - Modern Day Addiction
| Engineer of the Year
| 
|-
| 2011
| Are You Ready Yet?
| Best Female Artist
| 
|-
| 2013
| The Winter I Choose Happiness
| Best Adult Contemporary Album
| 
|-

EG Awards / Music Victoria Awards
The EG Awards (known as Music Victoria Awards since 2013) are an annual awards night celebrating Victorian music. They commenced in 2006.

|-
| EG Awards of 2009
| Clare Bowditch
| Best Female
| 
|-
| EG Awards of 2011
| Clare Bowditch
| Best Female
| 
|-
|rowspan="2"| EG Awards of 2012
| The Winter I Chose Happiness
| Best Album
| 
|-
| Clare Bowditch
| Best Female
| 
|-

J Award
The J Award is an award given by influential Australian youth radio station Triple J to Australian Album of the Year. It is judged by the music and on-air teams at triple j, Unearthed and Double J.

|-
| J Award of 2005
| What Was Left
| Australian Album of the Year
| 
|-

Logie Awards
The Logie Awards (officially the TV Week Logie Awards) is an annual gathering to celebrate Australian television. Awards are presented in 20 categories representing both public and industry voted awards.

|-
| Logie Awards of 2013
| Clare Bowditch in Offspring (Network Ten)
| Logie Award for Most Popular New Female Talent
| 
|-

References

External links

1975 births
Living people
ARIA Award winners
Australian indie pop musicians
Actresses from Melbourne
Singers from Melbourne
Australian indie rock musicians
Australian television actresses
21st-century Australian actresses
21st-century Australian singers
21st-century Australian women singers
People from Sandringham, Victoria